CHUO-FM is a Canadian community-based campus radio station, broadcasting at 89.1 FM in Ottawa, on Rogers digital cable on channel 943, via RealAudio stream and in MP3. It is the campus radio station of the University of Ottawa, a member of the National Campus and Community Radio Association in Canada, and a member of the world community radio association AMARC.

CHUO's studios are located on the campus of the University of Ottawa, while its transmitter is located in Camp Fortune, Quebec.

History

The station began as a radio club transmitting as CHOR, an AM carrier current station on 670 kHz in 1975 on the University of Ottawa campus.  By 1984 CHOR was known as CFUO which started cable-casting and could be heard on closed circuit in the university's student residences. It was subsequently awarded a broadcast license by the CRTC, and began broadcasting at 89.1 FM on May 31, 1991.

The station is bilingual, broadcasting in both of Canada's official languages; English and French. CHUO's programming is composed of 35% English programming, 35% French programming, and 10% in third languages. CHUO's programming is free form including the genres of jazz, indie rock, electronic, classical alongside many radio programs produced BY and FOR the Black community including Ici L'Afrique, Afrika Revisited, Black on Black, Rockers, Caribbean Flavour, Bouyon Racin, Men Kontré, FREESTYLE, and more.

CHUO 89.1 FM launched a morning drive-time hip-hop show in June 2019.

Notables
As one of the founding volunteers, Papa Richie has hosted and produced Rockers since 1986. Patricia Harewood, Adrienne Codette, Jacquie Stewart, Sarah Onyango, Denise Isaacs and Jackie Lawrence are some members of the collective who have hosted Black on Black (Ottawa's premiere black community arts and culture show) since the early 1990s. Tom Green hosted The Midnight Caller on the station for several years in the mid-1990s before moving to television with Rogers Cable's Ottawa community channel. CHUO alumni include Adrian Harewood (CBC), Laura Osman (CBC), Emma Godmere (CBC), Alanna Stuart (BONJAY, CBC), Terry Loretto (CBC)

In 1997, CHUO won a Standard Broadcast award for a bilingual spoken word series entitled "Women's Words" created by Carolyn Cote and produced by Erin Flynn.
In 2009, CHUO was the proud recipient of two National Campus and Community Radio awards. André St-Jacques, host of Jazz Vox, Jazz et Compagnie, Rétro Radio, les Écrans Compacts, and Café Québec, won an award in the category of NCRA Volunteer of the year. DJ Alive and Your Favourite Light Skin won the 2009 NCRA award for local talent development.
The 2016 Women's Hands & Voices honorable mention went to Ladies First, hosted and produced by Lina Asfour. https://awards.ncra.ca/womens-hands-and-voices-2016/ The Album Drop hosted and produced by Phil Shirakawa took home the 2016 award for best Music Program. https://awards.ncra.ca/music-programming-2016/ The Current Affairs or Magazine Programming 2016 Honourable Mention went to Mackenzie Smedmor for Beneath The Underground.  https://awards.ncra.ca/current-affairs-or-magazine-programming-2016/    
Phil McGarty's Live Sessions feat. Airliner & NMIS received the 2017 honourable mention in the music category. https://awards.ncra.ca/music-2017/ 
The 2018 Pop, Rock or Dance Honourable Mention went to The Album Drop's Year In Review - 2017: Part 1 - hosted and produced by Phil Shirakawa.  https://awards.ncra.ca/music-awards-2018/ 
Randy McElligott, long time host of In Transition was awarded Volunteer of the year in 2019.https://awards.ncra.ca/volunteer-of-the-year-2019-draw/ Emmanuel Sayer & Travis Boisvenue, CHUO-FM City Slang’s Tribute to Peter Eichhorn of P. Trash Records (R.I.P.) City won Best Syndicated Radio in 2019 https://awards.ncra.ca/syndicated-radio-2019/ 
In 2022, former Music Director Joni Sadler won the Radio Legend award posthumously. https://awards.ncra.ca/2022-community-radio-legend-award/

Studios

The station's studios used to be located in a walkway linking University of Ottawa's Morisset Library with the Thompson student residence. In September 2005 the station moved to new facilities in the sub-basement of the Morisset library at 65 University Private, suite 0038. Office hours are from Monday to Friday, 9 am to 5 pm.

References

External links
CHUO
Listen Live (MP3 Streaming)
 

Radio stations established in 1984
Huo
University of Ottawa
Huo
1984 establishments in Ontario